American Civil War reenactment is an effort to recreate the appearance of a particular battle or other event associated with the American Civil War by hobbyists known (in the United States) as Civil War reenactors, or living historians.

Although most common in the United States, there are also American Civil War reenactors in Canada, the United Kingdom, Germany, Australia, Italy, Denmark, Sweden, and Poland.

History 
Reenacting the American Civil War began even before the real fighting had ended. Civil War veterans recreated battles as a way to remember their fallen comrades and to teach others what the war was all about. The Great Reunion of 1913, celebrating the 50th anniversary of the Battle of Gettysburg, was attended by more than 50,000 Union and Confederate veterans, and included reenactments of elements of the battle, including Pickett's Charge. 
Modern reenacting is thought to have begun during the 1961–1965 Civil War Centennial commemorations. Reenacting grew in popularity during the 1980s and 1990s, due in large part to the success of the 125th Anniversary reenactment near the original Manassas battlefield, which was attended by more than 6,000 reenactors. That year, Time magazine estimated there were more than 50,000 reenactors in the U.S.

In 1998, the 135th anniversary re-enactment of the Battle of Gettysburg took place near the original battlefield.  There have been several estimates on the number of participants, but it is widely agreed that it was the largest re-enactment ever held anywhere in the world, with between 15,000 and 20,000 re-enactors participating.  This event was watched by about 50,000 spectators.

Participation

American Civil War reenactments have drawn a fairly sizable following of enthusiastic participants, young and old, willing to brave the elements and expend money and resources in their efforts to duplicate the events down to the smallest recorded detail. Participants may even attend classes put on by event sponsors where they learn how to dress, cook, eat, and even "die" just as real Civil War soldiers would have. Most reenactments have anywhere from 100 to thousands of participants, portraying either Union or Confederate infantry, artillery, or cavalry forces.  Some people, though uncommon, may portray Engineers or Marines. The 135th anniversary Gettysburg reenactment (1998) is generally believed to be the most-attended reenactment, with attendance estimates ranging from 15,000 to over 20,000 reenactors.

Reasons given for participating in such activities vary. Some participants are interested in getting a historical perspective on the turbulent times that gripped the nation, particularly if they can trace their ancestry back to those who fought in the war. In some cases, if there are not enough reenactors present on one side, reenactors from the other side are asked to change sides, or "galvanize", for the day/event.

Although many periods are reenacted around the world, Civil War reenactment is, by far, the most popular in the US. In 2000, the number of Civil War reenactors was estimated at 50,000, though the number of participants declined sharply through the ensuing decade, to around 30,000 in 2011. Possible reasons for the decline include the cost of participating and the variety of other entertainment options. The 150th anniversary of the war has regenerated interest and stimulated growth in the hobby.  The numbers of reenactors steadily climbed to past levels.

Although women and children commonly participate in reenactments as civilians (portraying, for example, members of a soldiers' aid society), some women also take part in military portrayals. This is controversial within the reenactment community, although there are documented cases of women who disguised their gender to fight in the war.  Lee Taylor Middleton, author of "Hearts of Fire:  Soldier Women of the American Civil War" has documented hundreds of such female soldiers.  DeAnne Blanton and Lauren M. Cook, authors of "They Fought Like Demons: Women Soldiers in the American Civil War" document 240 soldiers in this work.  DeAnne Blanton, a Senior Military Archivist at the National Archives in Washington, D.C. is currently updating her book and believes the number may be closer to seven hundred women.  Almost all of the women did so disguised as men. Attitudes on this topic seem to vary widely.  Some "hardcore" reenactment units will not admit women at all; others allow their presence if a real woman soldier is known to have fought in its real-life counterpart regiment; other units admit anyone who wants to fight.

Categories of reenactors
Reenactors are commonly divided (or self-divide) into three categories, based on the level of concern for authenticity.

Farbs
Some, called "Farbs" or "polyester soldiers" are reenactors who spend relatively little of their time or money maintaining authenticity with regard to uniforms, accessories, or even period behavior. The 'Good Enough' attitude is pervasive among farbs, although even casual observers may be able to point out flaws. Blue jeans, tennis shoes, polyester (and other synthetic fabrics), zippers, velcro, snoods, baseball caps and modern cigarettes are common issues.    	 
	 
The term "FARB" was commonly used during the Bicentennial Celebration of the Revolutionary War and stood for Far Off Resembles British, as comment on the lack of authenticity of some of the groups who participated at that time.  It became after that a statement as to the commitment of the authenticity of any group whose lack of attention to detail was obvious.

Mainstream
Another group of reenactors often is called "Mainstream." These reenactors are somewhere between farb and progressive. They are more common than either farbs or progressives.	 
	 
Most mainstream reenactors make an effort at appearing authentic, but may come out of character in the absence of an audience. Visible stitches are likely to be sewn in a period-correct manner, but hidden stitches and undergarments may not be period-appropriate. Food consumed before an audience is likely to be generally appropriate to the early 1860s, but it may not be seasonally and locally appropriate. Modern items are sometimes used "after hours" or in a hidden fashion. The common attitude is to put on a good show, but that accuracy need only go as far as others can see.

Progressive

At the other end of the spectrum from farbs are "hard-core authentics" or "progressives", as they prefer to be called. Sometimes derisively called "stitch counters", many people have misconceptions about hardcore reenactors.

Hard-cores generally seek an "immersive" reenacting experience, trying to live, as much as possible, as someone of the 1860s might have. This includes eating seasonally and regionally appropriate food, undergarments in a period-appropriate manner, and staying in character throughout an event. The desire for an immersive experience often leads hard-core reenactors to smaller events, and to setting up separate camps at larger events, which other reenactors often perceive as elitism.

Character reenactors
Some reenactors portray a specific officer or person such as General Robert E. Lee, General Ulysses S. Grant, President Abraham Lincoln, Jefferson Davis, or a less well known officer such as Col. Abram Fulkerson.  Character reenactors may also portray a civilian man, woman, or child of significance.  These reenactors often do not participate in the actual combat portion of the reenactment and serve as narrators to the audience during the battle.  Often, character reenactors have extensively researched the person they portray and present a first-person narrative of his story.

Civilian reenactors

In addition to military reenactment, a significant part of Civil War reenactment includes the portrayal of civilians, including men, women, and children from infants to young adults. This can include portrayals as diverse as soldiers' aid societies, sutlers, saloon proprietors, musicians, and insurance salesmen.

Types of Civil War reenactments

Public events
A typical Civil War Reenactment takes place over a weekend with the reenactors arriving on Friday and camping on site while spectators view the event on Saturday and Sunday. Usually each reenactment is centered around a Saturday battle and Sunday battle (often, but not always, intended to recreate an actual battle from the Civil War) in addition to many of the activities listed below. Essentially, a traditional public reenactment is a three-day-long affair that incorporates elements from each of the following categories.

Living histories
Living histories are meant entirely for education of the public. Such events do not necessarily have a mock battle but instead are aimed at portraying the life, and more importantly the lifestyle, of the average Civil War soldier. This does include civilian reenacting, a growing trend. Occasionally, a spy trial is recreated, and a medic too. More common are weapons and cooking demonstrations, song and leisure activities, and lectures. These should not, however, be confused with Living history museums.  These outlets for living history utilize museum professionals and trained interpreters in order to convey the most accurate information available to historians.

Living history is the only reenactment permitted on National Park Service land; NPS policy "does not allow for battle reenactments (simulated combat with opposing lines and casualties) on NPS property."

Public demonstrations

Public demonstrations are smaller mock battles put on by reenacting organizations and/or private parties primarily to show the public how people in the 1860s lived, and to show the public Civil War battles. The battles are only loosely based on actual battles, if at all, and may consist of demonstrations of basic tactics and maneuvering techniques.

Scripted battles
Scripted battles are reenactment in the strictest sense; the battles are planned out beforehand so that the companies and regiments make the same actions that were taken in the original battles. They are often fought at or near the original battle ground or at a place very similar to the original. A common question of non-reenactors concerns the determination of who "dies" over the course of the battle. Reenactors commonly refer to the act of being killed or wounded as "taking a hit" and is typically left up to the individual's discretion, although greatly influenced by the events of the battle. Because most battles are based on their historical counterparts it is generally understood when to begin taking hits and to what extent.

Closed events

Total immersion events
Total immersion events are made up solely of progressive ("hard-core authentic") reenactors, who often refer to them as "Events By Us and For Us" or "EBUFU". As the names imply, these events are held for the personal edification of the reenactors involved, allowing them to spend an extended time marching, eating, and generally living like actual soldiers of the Civil War. Total immersion events generally require participants to meet a high standard of authenticity, and in most cases little or none of the event will be open to public viewing.

Tactical battles

Tactical battles, which may or may not be open to the public, are fought like real battles with each side devising strategies and tactics to defeat their opponent(s). They have no script, a basic set of agreed-upon rules (physical boundaries, time limit, victory conditions, etc.), and onsite judges or referees, and so could be considered a form of live action role-playing game. Tactical battles might also be considered a form of experimental archaeology.

Reenactment and media
Motion picture and television producers often turn to reenactment groups for support; films like Gettysburg, Glory, Field of lost shoes and Gods and Generals benefited greatly from the input of reenactors, who arrived on set fully equipped and steeped in knowledge of military procedures, camp life, and tactics.

In a documentary about the making of the film Gettysburg, actor Sam Elliott, who portrayed Union General John Buford in the film, said of reenactors:

At times, however, the relationship between reenactors and filmmakers has been contentious. Although reenactors for Gettysburg were unpaid, money was contributed on their behalf to a trust for historic preservation; however, some subsequent productions have offered no such compensation. Also, in some cases reenactors have clashed with directors over one-sided portrayals and historical inaccuracies. Some producers have been less interested in accuracy than in the sheer number of reenactors, which can result in safety issues. Finally, large film productions, like Gettysburg, can draw enough reenactors to cause the cancellation of other events.

Tony Horwitz covered hardcore reenacting in Confederates In The Attic, released in 1998.

On April 4, 2013, Jeffrey S. Williams released Muskets and Memories: A Modern Man's Journey through the Civil War, a mix of modern reenactment narrative with historical facts.

In 2016, a documentary called When To Die was produced and directed by Justin Miller and John Paul Pacelli. It followed four Civil War reenactors and explored their relationship with the hobby.

Talene Monahon's 2020 play  How to Load a Musket, is about Civil War reenactors.

Incidents
In 1998, a reenactor at a Battle of Gettysburg recreation borrowed a handgun that contained a "squib" (a bullet lodged halfway down the barrel). Without having inspected the gun before loading the blank charge, the reenactor wounded another reenactor in the neck.

Criticism 
Author Jenny Thompson discusses in her book the "fantasy farb", or tendency of reenactors to gravitate towards "elite" units such as commandos, paratroopers, or Waffen-SS units. This results in under-representation in the reenactment community of what were the most common types of military troops in the period being reenacted. The question has arisen among North American reenactors, but similar issues exist in Europe. For example, in Britain, a high proportion of Napoleonic War reenactors perform as members of the 95th Rifles (perhaps due to the popularity of the fictional character of Richard Sharpe) and medieval groups have an over-proportion of plate-armoured soldiers.

Some veterans have criticised military reenactment as glorifying 'what is literally a human tragedy.' "‘If they knew what a war was like’, said one Second World War combat veteran, ‘they’d never play at it’. Further, some feminists have critiqued Civil War reenactment, arguing that it "builds up a prosthetic symbolic male white body, embedded in an archaic racialized gender system: the clothing and the tools normally intensify male whiteness. Thus, even if the outer appearance of the uniformed female reenactor is flawless, her participation is deemed unacceptable by most male reenactors." Some reenactments more recently have allowed women to participate as combatants as long as their appearance can pass as male from a specified distance, or if they are representing a specific historical woman who fought in the Civil War while cross-dressing as a man. Other units have allowed women to participate unconditionally.

A final concern is that reenactors may be accused of being, or actually be, aligned with the political beliefs that some of the reenacted armies fought for, such as Nazism or the Confederate South. For example, U.S. politician Rich Iott's participation in a World War II reenactment in which he was in the group that portrayed the German 5th SS Panzer Division Wiking side excited media criticism during his 2010 Congressional campaign. In 2017, in the weeks following a far-right rally in Charlottesville, Virginia at which a neo-Nazi killed a counterprotester, some reenactors complained about—as one reporter put it—"the co-opting of the [Civil] war by neo-Nazis." Similar accusations have been made against Igor Girkin, who has led Russian-aligned forces in the annexation of Crimea and war in Donbas and is also a well-known reenactor.

See also
Historical reenactment
American Civil War
Cosplay

Notes

References
 Hadden, Robert Lee. "Reliving the Civil War: A reenactor's handbook". Mechanicsburg, PA: Stackpole Books, 1999.

 John Skow, et al., "Bang, Bang! You're History, Buddy," Time (August 11, 1986): 58.
 Stanton, Cathy (1999-11-01). "Reenactors in the Parks: A Study of External Revolutionary War Reenactment Activity at National Parks" (PDF) National Park Service. Retrieved on 2008-07-28.

External links 

 Reenactor.net
 The Civil War Reenactor's homepage
 The Authentic Campaigner
 Union Volunteers - Reenactors 
 http://www.thesewingacademy.org/
 The Camp Chase Gazette
 JonahWorld!
 The Civil War Living History Institute
 American civil war re-enactment in Italy
 Reenactors
 2013-2015 Civil War Reenactment Calendar

 
Historical reenactment by war